Jennifer Diane Reitz (born December 30, 1959) is an American writer, webcomic author, and game designer. She is known for the website Happy Puppy, which she opened with her partners, Stephen P. Lepisto and Sandra Woodruff, and with whom she created the video game Boppin'. Reitz has also done game work for Interplay.

On February 14, 1995 Reitz and her partners launched the game website Happy Puppy where they posted game demos. For a period of time, the website was the most visited game website on the Internet and had about 2.5 million downloads per month during 1996, the same year Happy Puppy was acquired by Attitude Network. The website later went offline in 2006. Reitz writes game reviews and co-founded a family company, Accursed Toys.

Reitz is a trans woman and the founder of the site Transsexuality (transsexual.org), a site with general information on transsexualism that hosts the COGIATI (COmbined Gender Identity And Transsexuality Inventory) test. The test has been criticized for relying on stereotypical views of gender; it assumes, for example, that a lack of interest in mathematics is a feminine trait.

Webcomics

Unicorn Jelly
Pastel Defender Heliotrope
To Save Her
Impossible Things Before Breakfast

References

External links
 
 Transsexual.org
 Otaku World
 
 Interview at Classic DOS Games
Interview at The Setup

1959 births
Living people
American agnostics
American webcomic creators
Female comics writers
American LGBT artists
LGBT comics creators
People from Baker City, Oregon
Transgender artists
Transgender women
American female comics artists
American transgender writers